Antonio Zarro (born August 17, 1970) is an Italian-American, director and actor. Zarro received a Student Academy Award in 1987 for Bird in a Cage, a 60-minute 1986 student film made while attending the Christian Broadcasting Network University (now Regent University) which received a positive review in the All Movie Guide. This film was the first from CBNU to win an Academy Award.

Career
His work has screened at the NY Film Festival, the Chicago Film Festival, the Virginia Festival of American Film, the Columbus Film Festival, Worldfest-Houston and Worldfest-Flagstaff. A few of Zarro's awards include: a student Academy Award, a Cine Golden Eagle, a Telly, an Addy, a Mercury Award, a Questar, an Aurora Award, an Axion and an Apex. He is a member of the Screen Actors Guild, acting in movies, television and the theatre. In 1998, Zarro established the Zarro Acting Academy, training film actors on the East Coast. His classes have given numerous students a start in major motion pictures, prime time television and national cable shows.

In addition, he taught as an adjunct instructor at Regent University (1989–1991) in Virginia Beach, Virginia and Old Dominion University (2001–2006) in Norfolk, Virginia. During his undergrad years, Zarro was President of the Communications chapter of Alpha Epsilon Rho and his video dramas won regional and national awards. In 1986, he wrote and directed a student film Bird in a Cage, which won a Student Academy Award. He has a BA from the University of Tulsa in Television and Theatre and an MA from Regent in Film. He made an uncredited appearance as a soldier in the Ted Turner film Gods and Generals.

He is currently assistant professor of cinema-television at Palm Beach Atlantic University.

Film

Television

References

External links
 

American male film actors
American people of Italian descent
American film directors
American film editors
Living people
American film producers
1961 births
Male actors from Rome
Italian emigrants to the United States
Regent University alumni
Regent University faculty
Old Dominion University faculty
Palm Beach Atlantic University faculty
University of Tulsa alumni
21st-century American male actors